The Toronto Summer Music Festival (TSMF) is a classical music festival and academy held annually in Toronto, Ontario, Canada.
Douglas McNabney, violist and Associate Professor (Chamber Music) at McGill at the Schulich School of Music, was appointed Artistic Director of TSMF in August 2010. In August 2016 Mr. McNabney handed over the reins to his successor Jonathan Crow.

Musicians perform at concerts held at The Royal Conservatory of Music at Koerner Hall, and at the University of Toronto, Faculty of Music.
2013 marked the eighth season of TSMF.

References

External links 
 Official Website of the Toronto Summer Music Festival

Classical music festivals in Canada
Music festivals in Toronto